The  is a railway line in Fukushima Prefecture, Japan operated by East Japan Railway Company (JR East). It connects Iwaki Station in Iwaki and Kōriyama Station in Kōriyama.

Service
All trains are operated as local services in 2-, 3-, or 5-car formations. Service between Kōriyama and Ononiimachi is provided once every 30 minutes to two hours, but between Ononiimachi and Iwaki, there is a period of five hours where no trains operate. One reason for the few continuous services between Iwaki and Kōriyama is the opening of the parallel Ban-etsu Expressway in 1995; as a result, most long distance passengers use highway bus services.

The last express service, Iwaki, stopped running in 1982. During peak holiday periods such as Golden Week, Obon, and New Year, the rapid Abukuma makes a single round trip with a 2-car train.

Station list 
All stations are located in Fukushima Prefecture.
 Trains can pass one another at stations marked "◇", "∨", or "∧". Trains cannot pass at stations marked "｜".

Rolling stock
As of February 2009, the following rolling stock is used on the East Ban'etsu Line.
 KiHa 110 series DMUs

History 
The line was planned by the Railway Construction Act in 1892. When the two sections were connected in 1917, the line became the Ban'etsu East Line.

Freight services ceased in 1987.

References

External links

 Stations of the Ban'etsu East Line (JR East) 

 
Lines of East Japan Railway Company
Rail transport in Fukushima Prefecture
1067 mm gauge railways in Japan
Railway lines opened in 1915